Nakazō I Nakamura (1736 – June 6, 1790)

, also known as Hidetsuru or Sakaeya, was a Japanese kabuki actor.

Nakamura was born in Edo.

He started playing villains at the Nakamura theater, then performed at the Ichimura theater, inventing a new acting style since known as Hidetsuru. He eventually became master of the Shigayama School of Dancing, introducing male roles in the shosagoto dances.

Nakamura died in Edo.

Works 
 Tsuki-yuki-hana nemonogatari ("Moon, Snow, and Flowers: Sweet Nothings"), his autobiography
 Hidetsuru nikki (Essays)

References

External links 
 Drawing

1736 births
1790 deaths
Kabuki
People from Tokyo
Kabuki actors